Polytremis is a mainly Chinese genus of grass skipper in the family Hesperiidae.

Species
 Polytremis annama Evans, 1937
 Polytremis caerulescens (Mabille, 1876) China (Tibet)
 Polytremis choui Huang, 1994 China (Fujian)
 Polytremis discreta (Elwes & Edwards, 1897)
 Polytremis eltola (Hewitson, 1869)
 Polytremis flavinerva Chou & Zhou, 1994 China (Guangxi)
 Polytremis gigantea Tsukiyama, Chiba & Fujioka, 1997 China (Sichuan)
 Polytremis gotama Sugiyama, 1999 China (northwest Yunnan)
 Polytremis kiraizana (Sonan, 1938) 
 Polytremis lubricans (Herrich-Schäffer, 1869) Indomalayan realm 
 Polytremis matsuii Sugiyama, 1999 China (Dujiangyan)
 Polytremis mencia (Moore, 1877) China (Shanghai)
 Polytremis micropunctata Huang, 2003 China (northwest Yunnan)
 Polytremis minuta (Evans, 1926) 
 Polytremis nascens (Leech, 1893) China (Chia-kou-ho; Omei-Shan)
 Polytremis pellucida (Murray, 1875) 
 Polytremis suprema Sugiyama, 1999 
 Polytremis theca (Evans, 1937) China (Sichuan, Shaanxi, Fujian, Anhui, Yunnan)
 Polytremis zina (Evans, 1932) South China, East China, Ussuri

Host plants 
Species of the genus Polytremis feed on plants of the family Poaceae. Host plants include the genera Microstegium, Imperata, Miscanthus, Saccharum, Oryza, Phragmites and  Sasa.

References

Hesperiinae
Hesperiidae genera